Beason may refer to:

Beason (surname)
Beason, Illinois